Life in Emergency Ward 10 is a 1959 film directed by Robert Day. It stars Michael Craig and Wilfrid Hyde-White. It was based on the television series Emergency – Ward 10.

Cast
Michael Craig as Dr. Stephen Russell
Wilfrid Hyde-White as Professor Bourne-Evans
Dorothy Alison as Sister Jane Fraser
Glyn Owen as Dr. Paddy O'Meara
Rosemary Miller as Nurse Pat Roberts
Bud Tingwell as Dr. Alan Dawson 
Frederick Bartman as Dr. Simon Forrester 
Joan Sims as Mrs. Pryor 
Rupert Davies as Dr. Tom Hunter 
Sheila Sweet as Anne Hunter 
David Lodge as Mr. Phillips
Dorothy Gordon as Mrs. Phillips 
Christopher Witty as David Phillips 
Tony Quinn as Joe Cooney 
Douglas Ives as Potter 
George Tovey as Mr. Pryor 
Pauline Stroud as Nurse Vincent 
Christina Gregg as Nurse April Andrews
Kenneth J. Warren as Porter

References

External links

1959 films
British drama films
Films directed by Robert Day
Films based on television series
Films set in hospitals
1950s English-language films
1950s British films